Vuohipaimen is an EP by the black metal band Horna. It was released on Obscure Abhorrence Productions in 2004 and was limited to 1000 copies, first 100 copies came with a shirt.

Track listing
Aldebaranin Susi - 4:53
Oi Kallis Kotimaa (Trad.) - 4:17

Personnel

Additional personnel
 Christophe Szpajdel - logo

External links
Metal Archives
Official Horna Site

2004 EPs
Horna EPs